Kamanaickenpalayam is a town panchayat in the Tiruppur District in the southern Indian state of Tamil Nadu.  There are a total of 15 wards in the Panchayat.

There are more than 15 cotton yarns, weaving mills and looms around the Kamanaickenpalayam camp.

Administration
According to the 2009 district reorganization it will no longer be called a Town Panchayat in the future.  In addition, the work of extracting electricity from wind turbines is in progress.  The regional head office of the windmill operates here.

Politics
Kamanayakan Palayam is the hometown of AIADMK MLA Thiru Kanagaraj, who won the 2016 assembly elections in Sulur constituency by a margin of 36,000 votes.  Currently, Sulur legislator V.  P.  It is noteworthy that Kandasamy belongs to the same town.

Facilities
The town has 
 Weekly Market here is 98 years old. This weekly market was created during the British rule.
 Old library. There is also a new library.

Police Station
Kamanaickenpalayam Police Station was inaugurated by Queen Elizabeth II during the British rule.This police station was opened on 15.05.1926. It is the oldest police station in the history of Tamil Nadu Police.

Transportation
It is 28 km from here.  The railway station at Tirupur is 38 km away.  In the distance is the Coimbatore International Airport.  Buses are also available from Kamanaickenpalayam  to Pollachi, Thrissur, Guruvayur, Palladam, Tiruppur, Sulur Gobichettipalayam, Coonoor, Coimbatore, Bangalore, Dharmapuri, Hosur, Udumalai, Erode, Salem and city buses.  The Tirupur-Pollachi route is served by buses every 5 minutes.  Special buses are available for Palani, Anaimalai and Thiruvannamalai on special days.

Kamanaickenpalayam Junction
The Kamanayakan Palayam junction is the junction of four roads.  Pollachi and Kerala State Roads are located through this town.  Thus, it is the most important road for thousands of vehicles every day.  There are four most important roads from Kamanayakan Palayam to Avinashi via Palladam. one road from Kamanayakan Palayam to Pollachi, one road from Kamanayakan Palayam to Annur and one road from Kamanayakan Palayam to Vavipalayam via Udumalaipettai.  This causes occasional traffic congestion on the four-lane road.  It is noteworthy that it has now emerged as a city that sees a century past them all.

Educational Institutions
 Konguraja Primary School
 Panchayat Union Primary School
 Government High School
 Two of the Anganwadi Centers
 Kamban College of Arts and Sciences
 Scade College of Technology

Villages
 

Thirumandagoundanpalayam
Vadambacheri

Other Names
 kamanaickenpalayam
 Kamanaickenpalayam

References

www.tnpolice.gov.in
ICICI bank local

Cities and towns in Tiruppur district